The Money Bomb is a book by financial author James Gibb Stuart, outlining a system of reform for the British pound that was advocated by the Margaret Thatcher administration. Stuart claims it faced controversy when book stores and periodicals were threatened with blacklisting if they carried or covered the book.

Notes

Monetary reform
1983 non-fiction books